Solatopupa juliana is a species of air-breathing land snail, a terrestrial pulmonate gastropod mollusk in the family Chondrinidae.


Distribution
This species is present in the Italian mainland, with a peri-Tyrrhenian distribution, meaning around the Tyrrhenian Sea.

Description
The shell size reaches  in length.

References

  Pilsbry H. A. (1916–1918) – Manual of Conchology. Second Series: Pulmonata, 24. Pupillidae (Gastrocoptinae). pp. i–xii [= 1–12], 1–380, Pl. 1-49. Philadelphia.

External links

 Fauna Europaea
 Animalbase

Chondrinidae
Gastropods described in 1866